Ernest Leo Harris, Jr. (born December 23, 1947) is an American politician. He was a member of the Kentucky Senate from the 26th District, first elected in 1994. He is a member of the Republican Party. He announced in April 2020 that he would retire and not seek re-election.

References

Living people
1947 births
Republican Party Kentucky state senators
Politicians from Louisville, Kentucky
21st-century American politicians